Western Administrative Okrug, or Zapadny Administrative Okrug, is one of the twelve high-level territorial divisions (administrative okrugs) of the federal city of Moscow, Russia. As of the 2010 Census, its population was 1,285,914, up from 1,049,104 recorded during the 2002 Census.

Territorial divisions
The administrative okrug comprises the following thirteen districts:
Dorogomilovo
Filyovsky Park
Fili-Davydkovo
Krylatskoye
Kuntsevo
Mozhaysky
Novo-Peredelkino
Ochakovo-Matveyevskoye
Prospekt Vernadskogo
Ramenki
Solntsevo
Troparyovo-Nikulino
Vnukovo

Economy
The head office of AirBridgeCargo Airlines and offices of Intel are located in the Krylatsky Hills Business Park in Krylatskoye District of the administrative okrug. Red Wings Airlines has its head office in Vnukovo District.

Education
Moscow International Prescool, an international kindergarten, is situated in Prospekt Vernadskogo District.

The German School Moscow is located in Troparyovo-Nikulino District of the administrative okrug.

Moscow Korean School (MKS; 모스크바한국학교), a South Korean international school, is within Mozhaysky District.

International School of Moscow has its Krylatskoe Campus in the Krylatskoye District.

Sister cities

 Wetzlar, Hesse, Germany

References

Notes

Sources

 
Administrative okrugs of Moscow